For the 1956 Vuelta a España, the field consisted of 90 riders; 40 finished the race.

By rider

By nationality

References

1956 Vuelta a España
1956